The Kirklees EfW is a major moving grate incineration plant in Huddersfield, Kirklees, England. The incinerator is owned and operated by Suez Recycling and Recovery UK who signed a 25-year contract with Kirklees Council in 1998 with an option to increase the time period to 2028. The plant is integral to the waste strategy and Unitary Development plan of Kirklees Council, treating  of locally generated municipal waste, which when incinerated, will produce enough electricity to power 15,000 homes. Only  of waste is actually incinerated, the other tonnages permitted are recovered materials such as metals (for recycling) and Incinerator bottom ash (IBA) and Fly ash.

The incinerator has been operational since 2002 and was one of the first waste projects financed by PFI in the United Kingdom. The plant, which employs 29 staff and operates 24 hours a day, cost £35 million.

See also

Isle of Man Incinerator

References

External links

Photograph of Kirklees Incinerator
Kirklees Incinerator Background

Waste power stations in England
Buildings and structures in Huddersfield